Damaun may refer to:
Damau, an Indian drum
Daman and Diu, former union territory in Western India
Roman Catholic Archdiocese of Goa and Daman